In mathematics, tropical geometry is the study of polynomials and their  geometric properties when addition is replaced with minimization and multiplication is replaced with ordinary addition:

 
 

So for example, the classical polynomial  would become . Such polynomials and their solutions have important applications in optimization problems, for example the problem of optimizing departure times for a network of trains.

Tropical geometry is a variant of algebraic geometry in which polynomial graphs resemble piecewise linear meshes, and in which numbers belong to the tropical semiring instead of a field. Because classical and tropical geometry are closely related, results and methods can be converted between them. Algebraic varieties can be mapped to a tropical counterpart and, since this process still retains some geometric information about the original variety, it can be used to help prove and generalize classical results from algebraic geometry, such as the Brill–Noether theorem, using the tools of tropical geometry.

History 
The basic ideas of tropical analysis were developed independently using the same notation by mathematicians working in various fields. The central ideas of tropical geometry appeared in different forms in a number of earlier works. For example, Victor Pavlovich Maslov introduced a tropical version of the process of integration. He also noticed that the Legendre transformation and solutions of the Hamilton–Jacobi equation are linear operations in the tropical sense. However, only since the late 1990s has an effort been made to consolidate the basic definitions of the theory. This was motivated by its application to enumerative algebraic geometry, with ideas from Maxim Kontsevich and works by Grigory Mikhalkin among others.

The adjective tropical was coined by French mathematicians in honor of the Hungarian-born Brazilian computer scientist Imre Simon, who wrote on the field. Jean-Éric Pin attributes the coinage to Dominique Perrin, whereas Simon himself attributes the word to Christian Choffrut.

Algebra background 

Tropical geometry is based on the tropical semiring. This is defined in two ways, depending on max or min convention.

The min tropical semiring is the semiring , with the operations:
 
 

Similarly, the max tropical semiring is the semiring , with operations:

 
 

These semirings are isomorphic, under negation , and generally one of these is chosen and referred to simply as the tropical semiring. Conventions differ between authors and subfields: some use the min convention, some use the max convention.

The tropical semiring operations model how valuations behave under addition and multiplication in a valued field.

Some common valuated fields encountered in tropical geometry (with min convention) are:

  or its extensions with the p-adic valuation,  for a and b coprime to p.
 The field of Laurent series  (integer powers), or the field of (complex) Puiseux series , with valuation returning the smallest exponent of t appearing in the series.

Tropical polynomials 
A tropical polynomial is a function  that can be expressed as the tropical sum of a finite number of monomial terms. Thus a tropical polynomial F is the minimum of a finite collection of affine-linear functions in which the variables have integer coefficients, so it is concave, continuous, and piecewise linear.

Given a polynomial f in the Laurent polynomial ring  where K is a valued field, the tropicalization of f, denoted , is the tropical polynomial obtained from f by replacing multiplication and addition by their tropical counterparts and each constant in K by its valuation.  That is, if 

then

The set of points where a tropical polynomial F is non-differentiable is called its associated tropical hypersurface, denoted  (in analogy to the vanishing set of a polynomial). Equivalently,  is the set of points where the minimum among the terms of F is achieved at least twice.

Tropical varieties

Definitions 
For X an algebraic variety in the algebraic torus , the tropical variety of X or tropicalization of X, denoted , is a subset of  that can be defined in several ways.  The equivalence of these definitions is referred to as the Fundamental Theorem of Tropical Geometry.

Intersection of tropical hypersurfaces 
Define

When X is a hypersurface, its vanishing ideal  is a principal ideal generated by a Laurent polynomial f, and the tropical variety  is precisely the tropical hypersurface .

Every tropical variety is the intersection of a finite number of tropical hypersurfaces. The intersection of a finite number of a tropical hypersurfaces is called a tropical prevariety and in general is not a tropical variety.

Initial ideals 

Then define

Since we are working in the Laurent ring, this is the same as the set of weight vectors for which  does not contain a monomial.

Image of the valuation map 
Then define

where the overline indicates the closure in the Euclidean topology.

This definition shows that  is the non-Archimedean amoeba over an algebraically closed non-Archimedean field K.

Polyhedral complex 
The following characterization describes tropical varieties intrinsically without reference to algebraic varieties and tropicalization.
When d is one, the zero-tension condition means that around each vertex, the weighted-sum of the out-going directions of edges equals zero. For higher dimension, sums are taken instead around each cell of dimension  after quotienting out the affine span of the cell.

Tropical curves 
The study of tropical curves (tropical varieties of dimension one) is particularly well developed and is strongly related to graph theory. For instance, the theory of divisors of tropical curves are related to chip-firing games on graphs associated to the tropical curves.

Many classical theorems of algebraic geometry have counterparts in tropical geometry, including:

 Pappus's hexagon theorem.  
 Bézout's theorem. 
 The degree-genus formula.
 The Riemann–Roch theorem.
 The group law of the cubics.

Oleg Viro used tropical curves to classify real curves of degree 7 in the plane up to isotopy.  His method of patchworking gives a procedure to build a real curve of a given isotopy class from its tropical curve.

Applications 
A tropical line appeared in Paul Klemperer's design of auctions used by the Bank of England during the financial crisis in 2007. Yoshinori Shiozawa defined subtropical algebra as max-times or min-times semiring (instead of max-plus and min-plus). He found that Ricardian trade theory (international trade without input trade) can be interpreted as subtropical convex algebra. Tropical geometry has also been used for analyzing the complexity of feedforward neural networks with ReLU activation.
 
Moreover, several optimization problems arising for instance in job scheduling, location analysis, transportation networks, decision making and discrete event dynamical systems can be formulated and solved in the framework of tropical geometry. A tropical counterpart of the Abel–Jacobi map can be applied to a crystal design. The weights in a weighted finite-state transducer are often required to be a tropical semiring. Tropical geometry can show self-organized criticality.

See also
 Tropical analysis
 Tropical compactification

Notes

References

 Maslov, Victor (1986). "New superposition principle for optimization problems", Séminaire sur les Équations aux Dérivées Partielles 1985/6, Centre de Mathématiques de l’École Polytechnique, Palaiseau, exposé 24.
 Maslov, Victor (1987). "Méthodes Opératorielles".  Moscou, Mir, 707 p. (See Chapter 8, Théorie linéaire sur semi moduli, pp. 652–701).

Further reading
 
 Tropical geometry and mirror symmetry

External links
 Tropical Geometry, I